Cyclopædia: or, An Universal Dictionary of Arts and Sciences is an encyclopedia prepared by Ephraim Chambers and first published in 1728; six more editions appeared between 1728 and 1751 with a Supplement in 1753. The Cyclopædia was one of the first general encyclopedias to be produced in English.

Noteworthy features
The title-page of the first edition summarizes the aims of the author:

The first edition included numerous cross-references meant to connect articles scattered by the use of alphabetical order, a dedication to the king, George II, and a philosophical preface at the beginning of Volume 1. Among other things, the preface gives an analysis of forty-seven divisions of knowledge, with classed lists of the articles belonging to each, intended to serve as a table of contents and also as a directory indicating the order in which the articles should be read.

Printing history
A second edition appeared in 1738 in two volumes in folio, with 2,466 pages. This edition was supposedly retouched and amended in a thousand places, with a few added articles and some enlarged articles. Chambers was prevented from doing more because the booksellers were alarmed by a bill in Parliament containing a clause to oblige the publishers of all improved editions of books to print their improvements separately. The bill, after passing the House of Commons, was unexpectedly thrown out by the House of Lords; but fearing that it might be revived, the booksellers thought it best to retreat though more than twenty sheets had been printed.

Five other editions were published in London from 1739 to 1751–1752. An edition was also published in Dublin in 1742; this and the London editions were all 2 volumes in folio. An Italian translation appearing in Venice, 1748–1749, 4to, 9 vols., was the first complete Italian encyclopaedia. When Chambers was in France in 1739, he rejected very favorable proposals to publish an edition there dedicated to Louis XV.

Chambers' work was carefully done, and popular. However, it had defects and omissions, as he was well aware; at his death, on 15 May 1740, he had collected and arranged materials for seven new volumes. George Lewis Scott was employed by the booksellers to select articles for the press and to supply others, but he left before the job was finished. The job was then given to Dr. John Hill. The Supplement was published in London in 1753 in two folio volumes with 3307 pages and 12 plates. Hill was a botanist, and the botanical part, which had been weak in the Cyclopaedia, was the best.

Abraham Rees, a nonconformist minister, published a revised and enlarged edition in 1778–1788, with the supplement and improvements incorporated. It was published in London, as a folio of 5 vols., 5,010 pages (but not paginated), and 159 plates. It was published in 418 numbers at 6d. each. Rees claimed to have added more than 4,400 new articles. At the end, he gave an index of articles, classed under 100 heads, numbering about 57,000 and filling 80 pages. The heads, with 39 cross references, were arranged alphabetically.

Precursors 

Among the precursors of Chambers's Cyclopaedia was John Harris's Lexicon Technicum, of 1704 (later editions from 1708 through 1744). By its title and content, it was "An Universal English Dictionary of Arts and Sciences: Explaining not only the Terms of Art, but the Arts Themselves."  While Harris's work is often classified as a technical dictionary, it also took material from Newton and Halley, among others.

Successors 

Chambers's Cyclopaedia in turn became the inspiration for the landmark Encyclopédie of Denis Diderot and Jean le Rond d'Alembert, which owed its inception to a proposed French translation of Chambers's work begun in 1744 by John Mills, assisted by Gottfried Sellius. The later Chambers's Encyclopaedia (1860–1868) had no connection to Ephraim Chambers's work, but was the product of Robert Chambers and his brother William.

References

Further reading 

  
Bocast, Alexander. Chambers on Definition. McLean: Berkeley Bridge Press, 2016..
Bradshaw, Lael Ely. "Ephraim Chambers' Cyclopedia." Notable Encyclopedias of the Seventeenth and Eighteenth Centuries: Nine Predecessors of the Encyclopédie. Ed. Frank Kafker. Oxford: The Voltaire Foundation, 1981. 123–137..
Collison, Robert. Encyclopædias: Their History Throughout the Ages. New York: Hafner, 1966. 
Kafker, Frank. A. Notable Encyclopedias of the Late Eighteenth Century: Eleven Successors of the Encyclopédie. Oxford : Voltaire Foundation at the Taylor Institution, 1994.
Kolb, Gwin J. and James H. Sledd.  "Johnson's 'Dictionary' and Lexicographical Tradition."  Modern Philology 50.3 (Feb. 1953):  171–194.
Mack, Ruth.  "The Historicity of Johnson's Lexicographer."  Representations 76 (Fall 2001):  61–87.
Shorr, Phillip. Science and Superstition in the Eighteenth Century: A Study of the Treatment of Science in Two Encyclopedias of 1725–1750. New York: Columbia, 1932. 
Walsh, S. Patraig. "Cyclopaedia." Anglo-American General Encyclopedias: A Historical Bibliography, 1703–1967. New York: R.R. Bowker, 1968. 38–39. 
Yeo, Richard. "The Best Book in the Universe": Ephraim Chambers' Cyclopedia. In Encyclopædic Visions: Scientific Dictionaries and Enlightenment Culture. Cambridge: Cambridge UP, 2001. 120–169.
Yeo, Richard R. "A Solution to the Multitude of Books: Ephraim Chambers's Cyclopaedia (1728) as "the Best Book in the Universe."" Journal of the History of Ideas, v. 64 (1), 2003. pp. 61–72.

External links

Chambers' Cyclopaedia, 1728, 2 volumes, with the 1753 supplement, 2 volumes; digitized by the University of Wisconsin Digital Collections Center.
Chambers' Cyclopaedia, 1728, 2 volumes, articles are categorized.
Searchable 4th edition (1741), digitized at the University of Chicago Library as part of The ARTFL Project.
Cyclopaedia, or, An Universal Dictionary of Arts and Sciences: Containing an Explication of the Terms, and an Account of the Things Signified Thereby, in the Several Arts, Both Liberal and Mechanical, and the Several Sciences, Human and Divine sixth edition, 2 volumes; London: Printed for W. Innys et al., 1750

1728 books
British encyclopedias
English-language encyclopedias
Reference works in the public domain
 
18th-century encyclopedias